Shiloh-Scott is a St. Louis MetroLink station. Located adjacent to Scott Air Force Base in Shiloh, Illinois, this station is the eastern terminus of the MetroLink system. It opened on June 23, 2003, as part of Phase 2 of the St. Clair County Extension, which extended MetroLink  from College to Shiloh-Scott.

The Shiloh-Scott station is the terminus for the St. Clair County Transit District's 14 mile (22.5 km) MetroBikeLink shared-use path system. The 2.9 mile (4.7 km) segment connecting the College station to Shiloh-Scott was opened in 2017.

Station layout
The station is divided into two sections: one side is open to the general public and the other side to those with Scott Air Force Base security clearances. Each side has its own park and ride lot.

Extensions in progress
A 5.2-mile (8.4 km) expansion of the Red Line from Shiloh-Scott to MidAmerica St. Louis Airport in Mascoutah received $96 million in funding from the State of Illinois in 2019. The expansion will include a 2.6-mile double-track section, a 2.6-mile single-track section and a passenger station at the end of the alignment at MidAmerica Airport. Design work was completed in the summer of 2022 and a request for proposals was released that November. Construction on the expansion is expected to begin by March 2023 and be operational by spring 2025.

References

External links
 St. Louis Metro

St. Clair County Transit District
MetroLink stations in St. Clair County, Illinois
Red Line (St. Louis MetroLink)
Railway stations in the United States opened in 2003
2003 establishments in Illinois